Alexander Higgins may refer to:

 Alex Higgins (1949–2010), snooker player
 Alex Higgins (footballer, born 1863) (1863–1920), Scottish footballer
 Sandy Higgins (1888–1939), Scottish footballer
 Alexander Higgins (footballer, born 1870) (1870–?), English footballer
 Alex Higgins (footballer, born 1981), English footballer

See also 
 Alec Higgins (1908–1965), English rugby player